Statistics of the Mestaruussarja, the premier division of Finnish football, in the 1987 season.

Overview 
12 teams performed in the league, and HJK Helsinki won the championship.

League standings

Results

See also
Ykkönen (Tier 2)

References 
 Finland - List of final tables (RSSSF)

Mestaruussarja seasons
Fin
Fin
1